Borsunlu or Borsunly may refer to:
Borsunlu, Goranboy, Azerbaijan
Borsunlu, Tartar, Azerbaijan